Bukit Gelugor may refer to:
Bukit Gelugor
Bukit Gelugor (federal constituency), represented in the Dewan Rakyat
Bukit Gelugor (state constituency), formerly represented in the Penang State Legislative Assembly (1974–2004)